The O2 Academy Leicester is a music venue located in the English City of Leicester on the University of Leicester campus.

O2 Academy Leicester is the second largest purpose built live music venue in the city with a 1,450 Capacity. In addition there are two additional venues on site operating independently and simultaneously: O2 Academy2 Leicester with a 500 capacity and O2 Academy3 Leicester for 250 patrons.

The venue provides live music and club events, including student nights for The University of Leicester.

External links
Official website
Academy Music Group Official website
O2 Academy Leicester photo gallery from BBC Radio Leicester

Buildings and structures in Leicester
Music venues in Leicestershire
Culture in Leicestershire
Academy Leicester